Håkon Walde (25 April 1907 – 28 November 1988) was a Norwegian footballer. He played in two matches for the Norway national football team from 1929 to 1932.

References

External links
 

1907 births
1988 deaths
Norwegian footballers
Norway international footballers
Place of birth missing
Association footballers not categorized by position